The list of shipwrecks in 1864 includes ships sunk, foundered, grounded, or otherwise lost during 1864.

January

February

March

April

May

June

July

August

September

October

November

December

Unknown date

References

Notes

Bibliography
 Gaines, W. Craig, Encyclopedia of Civil War Shipwrecks, Louisiana State University Press, 2008 , .
 Ingram, C. W. N., and Wheatley, P. O., (1936) Shipwrecks: New Zealand disasters 1795–1936. Dunedin, NZ: Dunedin Book Publishing Association.

1864